GLEEP, which stood for Graphite Low Energy Experimental Pile, was a long-lived experimental nuclear reactor in Oxfordshire, England. Run for the first time on August 15, 1947, it was the first reactor to operate in western Europe.

It was built at the Atomic Energy Research Establishment, a former Royal Air Force airfield, near Harwell in Oxfordshire (then in Berkshire), in an aircraft hangar.  It was a graphite moderated, air-cooled reactor and used 11,500 natural uranium fuel aluminium-clad rods inserted into 676 horizontal fuel channels. With a normal power output of just 3 kilowatts, it was initially used for investigations into reactor design and operation, and later for the calibration of instruments for measuring neutron flux.

It had an exceptionally long life for a reactor of 43 years, being shut down in 1990. The fuel was removed in 1994 and the control rods and external equipment the following year.  A project to completely dismantle it was started in 2003 and completed in October 2004.

See also
List of nuclear reactors

External links
 Research Sites Restoration Limited
 Aerial photographs of reactor site

1947 establishments in England
1990 disestablishments in England
Graphite moderated reactors
Nuclear research institutes in the United Kingdom
Gleep
Nuclear technology in the United Kingdom
Research institutes in Oxfordshire
Vale of White Horse
Defunct nuclear reactors